"Coma" is a song by the hard rock band Guns N' Roses. It is the final song on their album Use Your Illusion I. At 10 minutes and 14 seconds, it is the longest track released by the band, and has no choruses.

Composition
Slash states that he wrote the music to this song in a house he and Izzy Stradlin rented in Hollywood Hills, following the Appetite for Destruction tours. In a 2011 interview, he stated he wrote the song in a "heroin delirium".

In an interview, Axl Rose talks about writing "Coma":

In an interview, on August 31, 1990, with MTV's Kurt Loder on Famous Last Words, Axl talks about the song "Coma":

Reception
Coma was ranked the 19th best Guns N' Roses song by Kerrang!.

Live performances
From 1991-1993 the song was performed only four times. A rare live version was featured on Japanese and vinyl copies of the Guns N' Roses live album Live Era: '87-'93. On April 8, 2016, the song was performed for the first time in almost twenty three years (last performed April 10, 1993) and became a setlist regular during the Not in This Lifetime... Tour.

Personnel
Guns N' Roses
 W. Axl Rose –lead vocals, production
 Slash – lead guitar, production
 Izzy Stradlin – rhythm guitar, production
 Duff McKagan – bass, production
 Matt Sorum – drums, production
Additional personnel
 Johann Langlie, Bruce Foster – sound effects
 Diane Mitchell, Michelle Loiselle, Monica Zierhut-Soto, Patricia Fuenzalida, Rose Mann, Susanne Filkins – spoken word female vocals

References

Guns N' Roses songs
1991 songs
Songs about death
Songs about drugs
Songs written by Axl Rose
Songs written by Slash (musician)
Progressive metal songs